Criorhina arctophiloides is a species of hoverfly in the family Syrphidae.

Distribution
Mexico.

References

Eristalinae
Diptera of North America
Insects described in 1892
Taxa named by Ermanno Giglio-Tos